Maleh and el Maleh are Arabic-language surnames. Notable people with the surnames include:

Edmond Amran El Maleh, Moroccan Jewish writer
Gad el Maleh, Moroccan-Canadian stand-up comedian and actor
Haitham al-Maleh, Syrian human rights activist and judge
Nabil Maleh, Syrian film director, screenwriter, producer, painter, and poet
Nadja Maleh, Austrian actress, singer, cabaret artist, and director
Youssef Maleh, Italian footballer

See also

Arabic-language surnames